This is an incomplete list of Acts of the Parliament of Great Britain, which was in existence from 1707 to 1800 (inclusive).

 List of Acts of the Parliament of Great Britain, 1707–1719
 List of Acts of the Parliament of Great Britain, 1720–1739
 List of Acts of the Parliament of Great Britain, 1740–1759
 List of Acts of the Parliament of Great Britain, 1760–1779
 List of Acts of the Parliament of Great Britain, 1780–1789
 List of Acts of the Parliament of Great Britain, 1790–1794
 List of Acts of the Parliament of Great Britain, 1795–1800

See also
For Acts passed up until the Act of Union 1707, see the separated
 List of Acts of the Parliament of England; and 
 List of Acts of the Parliament of Scotland to 1707; and
 List of Acts of the Parliament of Ireland.

For Acts passed from 1801 onwards see List of Acts of the Parliament of the United Kingdom.

For Acts of the devolved parliaments and assemblies in the United Kingdom, see the 
 List of Acts of the Scottish Parliament, the 
 List of Acts of the Northern Ireland Assembly, and the 
 List of Acts and Measures of the National Assembly for Wales, and the
 List of Acts of the Parliament of Northern Ireland.